Uslu is a Turkish surname. Notable people with the surname include:

 Binnaz Uslu (born 1985), Turkish middle distance track runner
 Recep Uslu, Turkish writer and researcher on Turkish musicology

See also
 Uslu, Sivrice

Turkish-language surnames